Mustapha, The Son Of Solyman The Magnificent is a 1665 tragedy by the Irish writer Roger Boyle, 1st Earl of Orrery. It was first performed by the Duke's Company at the Lincoln's Inn Fields Theatre in London. It is based on the life of Şehzade Mustafa, son of Suleiman the Magnificent who had him executed.

The original cast included Thomas Betterton as Solyman, Henry Harris as Mustapha, William Smith as Zanger, Samuel Sandford as  Rustan, John Richards as Pyrrhus, John Young as Cardinal of Veradium, Philip Cademan as Haly, James Nokes as Achmat, Edward Angel as Viche, Moll Davis as Queen of Hungaria, Matthew Medbourne as Thuricus, Jane Long as Zarma and Anne Shadwell as Cleora.

References

Bibliography
 Keenan, Tim. Restoration Staging, 1660-74. Taylor & Francis, 2016.
 Maguire, Nancy Klein. Regicide and Restoration: English Tragicomedy, 1660-1671. Cambridge University Press, 1992.
 Van Lennep, W. The London Stage, 1660-1800: Volume One, 1660-1700. Southern Illinois University Press, 1960.

1665 plays
English plays
Irish plays
West End plays
Tragedy plays
Plays set in the 16th century
Plays based on real people
Suleiman the Magnificent